Teban Gardens is a residential precinct located in Jurong East, Singapore.
Immediately north of Pandan Reservoir, it comprises exclusively public housing built by the JTC Corporation and Housing and Development Board.

Geography

The Teban Gardens estate is situated within the town of Jurong East. The main road servicing the estate is Teban Gardens Road.

Teban Gardens was originally a patch of mangrove swamp bordering on the Sungai Pandan area but was subsequently reclaimed to make way for housing development projects by the JTC Corporation in 1970.

Flanked on the south side by the Pandan Reservoir, the east side by the bank of Sungai Pandan and situated at the fringe of Jurong Industrial Estate, Teban Gardens sits on the crossroad from Singapore's city center and other parts of the island towards the various industrial estates located within Jurong, Tuas as well as the nearby Jurong Island.

History

Kampong Java Teban
Teban Gardens was derived from the former village in the area near Sungei Pandan, Kampong Java Teban (Malay: Kampung Jawa Teban).

Redevelopment
Although the land reclamation of the estate began in 1970, actual construction of the estate did not begin until after 1975 as the land needed time to settle after being reclaimed from the mangrove swampland of the Sungai Pandan. JTC Corporation undertook the construction of the public housing blocks in the estate as a means to provide additional housings for the families of the workers from the nearby areas of Jurong Industrial Estate. This was done to help ease the housing problem due in part by the overcrowding in the then nearby Taman Jurong housing estate, which was also built by JTC in 1969.

In 1977, the Housing and Development Board (HDB) – Singapore's state agency for public housing, took over the task of building more housing blocks, relieving JTC from this task to concentrate on its core mission of developing and managing the Jurong Industrial Estate. Currently, Teban Gardens and Pandan Gardens are satellite towns to the nearby Jurong East New Town.

The first housing block was completed around 1978 with a running sequence from block 401 to 416 (both 415 and 416 are four-storey shophouses). Recently some of the blocks has been demolished.

Notably, a number of companies such as Alfa Romeo, Carrier air-conditioners, Leica Camera, Konica Minolta, GE Industrial, Singapore Mint, Eltek Energy, Sin Tien Seng and Nordic Corp has set up their showroom, office or factory on a strip of land next to a road aptly named as Teban Gardens Crescent, which is sandwiched between the Ayer Rajah Expressway and the disused railway line of KTM (Jurong Line) that runs through the back of the town. Additionally, an International Business Park (IBP) was set up in the nearby town of Jurong East where companies and corporations such as Acer Inc., Creative Technology, Johnson & Johnson, MobileOne and the JTC Corporation are located.

Transportation

Roads
The main roads in this precinct are Penjuru Road, West Coast Road and Jurong Town Hall Road, which connects the precinct to the rest of the island through the AYE (Exits 13 and 14), with minor roads (Teban Gardens Road and Pandan Gardens) winding through the various places in the precinct.

Public transport
There is a feeder bus in this precinct, called 143M. It connects the precinct to Jurong East MRT station. Previously it was 241.

Trunk bus Services
There are 6 trunk bus services plying through Teban Gardens, of which all (except 176 and 30) originates from Jurong East Bus Interchange and therefore provide connection for people staying in this precinct to the Jurong East MRT station.

Apart from providing trunk bus connection to Jurong East MRT station,
51 connects the precinct to West Coast, Pasir Panjang, Queenstown, Bukit Merah, Tiong Bahru, Chinatown, Bugis, Kallang, Geylang, Eunos and Hougang.
78 connects the precinct to Jurong Port, West Coast and Clementi.
79 connects the precinct to Jurong Port, Pioneer Sector and Pioneer.
143 connects the precinct to West Coast, Clementi, Pasir Panjang, Chinatown, Orchard Road, Bukit Timah and Toa Payoh.

The other 3 trunk bus services that do not provide connection to Jurong East MRT station are
176 which connects the precinct to Bukit Batok, Bukit Panjang, Yuhua, West Coast, Pasir Panjang and Buona Vista.
30 which connects the precinct to Pioneer, Taman Jurong, West Coast, Pasir Panjang, Buona Vista, Telok Blangah, Harbourfront, Tanjong Pagar, Marina Bay, East Coast, Kallang, Geylang, Eunos and Bedok.
201 which connects the precinct to Clementi, West Coast and Kent Ridge.
There are also trunk bus service 178 and 154 which passes through the northern border of Teban Gardens along the Ayer Rajah Expressway.

Express and Premium services
There are 1 premium and 1 express bus services plying through Teban Gardens, of which all provide connection to the Central Business District on weekdays peak hours.
655 which connects the precinct to West Coast, Tanjong Pagar, Raffles Place and Marina Bay.
762 which connects the precinct to West Coast, Tanjong Pagar and Raffles Place.

Past transportation
Jurong Bus Depot / Interchange used to serve this precinct from 1978 to 1991 before all the bus services were re-routed, with most of them being rerouted to Jurong East Bus Interchange, which opened in 1988.
The Keretapi Tanah Melayu railway from Malaysia used to have an extension branching out from the Bukit Timah railway station to Shipyard Road and Jurong Port via Teban Gardens, providing freight railway services. This railway extension was intended for goods transportation as Jurong lacked good roads at the time. It was opened in 1965 amid much fanfare, but failed to generate satisfactory traffic. It was consequently closed in the early 1990s, and has since been partially dismantled.

Amenities

Market and Food Centres
Situated in the middle of the town is the Teban Gardens Wet Market & Food Centre, this serves the need of the residents as well as those from the nearby Pandan Gardens, which lacks one other than having a few shophouses of its own at block No.415 and 416.

Security
Located nearby at block No.43, is the Ayer Rajah Neighbourhood Police Post (NPP) of Clementi Police Division, which continues to serve the residents since its inauguration in 1985.

Community Centre
The precinct's community centre (Ayer Rajah Community Club) is located along Pandan Gardens, beside blocks 416 and 415.

Recreation
There are 3 parks in Teban Gardens, located in Teban Gardens Road, West Coast Road (opposite block 408) and along Sungei Pandan (in front of blocks 401 and 403) respectively. South of the precinct is the Pandan Reservoir, where water-based sports activities are carried out.

Schools
Currently, there is 1 primary school (Fuhua Primary School) and 1 secondary school (Commonwealth Secondary School) located in this precinct.

1 primary school (Pandan Primary School), 1 high school (River Valley High School) and 1 junior college (Jurong Junior College) used to be located here. Jurong Junior College started at its original location in 1981 and functioned there till 1985 being moving to a new location in 1985. The site was then re-allocated for River Valley High School from 1986 to 2003 before the school relocated to a temporary site along Malan Road in 2004 and its new permanent site in Boon Lay in 2010. In November 2006, the site was re-used and it houses Commonwealth Secondary School since then. Meanwhile, for Pandan Primary School, it existed from 1981 to 2008 before being merged with Fuhua Primary School in 2009.

Industrial
Industrial developments are located at the northern part of the precinct, along the Ayer Rajah Expressway.

Politics

, Teban Gardens is a part of Ayer Rajah ward within the West Coast GRC.

Together with Pandan Gardens, parts of Jurong East New Town and Clementi West New Town, the four estates formed the Single Member Constituency (SMC) of Ayer Rajah SMC prior to being absorbed into the West Coast GRC during the 2006's election in Singapore. Dr Tan Cheng Bock was the incumbent member of Parliament, since the formation of the ward in 1980, he subsequently retired in 2006 after making way for his successor – Mr S Iswaran. It was replaced by Foo Mee Har, part of the Ayer Rajah constituency.

See also
Taman Jurong
Jurong
Jurong East
Jurong East New Town
Jurong Lake
Pandan Reservoir
Pandan Gardens
West Coast Drive

Gallery

References

Places in Singapore
Jurong East